Pseudostellaria oxyphylla, the robust starwort or Robinson's starwort, is a rare plant species endemic to Idaho, known only from Kootenai and Shoshone Counties. It grows along streambanks in conifer forests at elevations of 800–900 m.

Pseudostellaria oxyphylla is an annual herb with fibrous roots. Stems are 4-angled, up to 30 cm long, with a thin line of hairs along one side. Leaves are narrow, up to 12 cm long. Flowers have green sepals and white petals.

References

oxyphylla
Flora of Idaho
Flora without expected TNC conservation status